Vinadio is a comune (municipality) in the Province of Cuneo in the Italian region of Piedmont, located about  southwest of Turin and about  southwest of Cuneo, on the border with France. It is located along the Stura di Demonte river.

Vinadio borders the following municipalities: Aisone, Demonte, Isola (France), Pietraporzio, Saint-Etienne-de-Tinée (France), Sambuco, and Valdieri.

Main sights
Vinadio is also home to an important fortification of the former Kingdom of Sardinia, the Forte Albertino.

Culture
In 2003 the town hosted the 'World Meeting of 2CV Friends', where approximately 7,000 people from around the world met and camped around the ancient Forte Albertino.

References

Cities and towns in Piedmont